Evans Island is an island located Kinabatangan District, Sabah, Malaysia.

External links 
 Pulau Evans on geoview.info
 Pulau Evans on getamap.net

Islands of Sabah
Kinabatangan District